Vardhman Mahavir Medical College (VMMC) is a medical college in New Delhi. It is attached with the famous Safdarjang Hospital for clinical teaching. The college runs under the umbrella of Guru Gobind Singh Indraprastha University.

Vardhman Mahavir Medical College was established at Safdarjung Hospital (one of the largest hospitals in India, started during the Second World War) in November 2001.

History
The Inauguration of the college was done by the then Honourable Prime Minister Sh. Atal Bihari Vajpayee on 17 December 2001 in presence of Sh.L.K.Advani, Sh. C. P. Thakur and Founder Principal Dr. Jagdish Prasad. Subsequently Prof. Jayashree Bhattacharya and Prof. N. N. Mathur served as the Principals of the college. Within few years of its existence, the college has become a preferred destination for students to seek admission. The first batch of MBBS students joined the college in February 2002. More than fifteen batches have joined since. The college has recognition by the Medical Council of India. It is included in the World Directory of Medical Schools and the Avicenna Directory of Medicine.

Affiliation
The college is affiliated to Guru Govind Singh I P University, Delhi. From 2008 onwards the postgraduate courses have been affiliated to GGSIPU which were with Delhi University.

Rankings

The college was ranked 8th among medical colleges in India in 2022 by India Today.

Infrastructure
Although the college began on a very modest note on infrastructure carved out of the portions of the Safdarjang Hospital. The college has a separate library building with an excellent collection of medical books and journals, and Internet facility. The college has a  faculty in the pre-clinical, para-clinical and clinical disciplines.

College festival 
Nirvana is the official annual literary, socio-cultural and sports festival of Vardhaman Mahavir Medical College and Safdarjang Hospital, New Delhi. It first started in 2004. Celebrities like the band Indian Ocean and Toshi have performed for a crowd that consisted of medical students from across the country as well as non-medical students and invitees from colleges affiliated to the Delhi University, Jawaharlal Nehru University and others, i.e., over 300 institutes.

References

Universities and colleges in Delhi
Medical colleges in Delhi
Colleges of the Guru Gobind Singh Indraprastha University